Mindarie Senior College is an independent public senior high school, located in the Perth outer northern suburb of Mindarie, Western Australia, The school hasn't had a renovation since 2003.

Established in 2003, the school provides an education for students in Year 11 and Year 12.

Overview 
Flexible hours offer students the ability to experience learning through placements at University, TAFE, or in the workforce. The college offers a wide choice of courses for those aiming for University and TAFE specialising in the Arts. Technology is used throughout the college enabling students to access their courses on-line.

Mindarie Senior College was one of six Australian Schools that were assessed as amount the top 65 of the world's best designs as featured in The 2006 OECD Compendium of Exemplary Educational Facilities.

See also

 List of schools in the Perth metropolitan area

References

External links 
 Mindarie Senior College site

Public high schools in Perth, Western Australia
2003 establishments in Australia
Educational institutions established in 2003